The Sun was a Burmese language newspaper published in Burma.  "Thuriya" is a Burmanized form of Suriya, "sun" in Pali. Burmese nationalists began publishing the newspaper on 4 July 1911, during which The Sun was published thrice a week.  In March 1915, due to its rising popularity, it became a daily, and was published until 14 October 1954. Its headquarters were in Yangon.

External links
The Irrawaddy Chronology of the Press in Burma

Daily newspapers published in Myanmar
Newspapers established in 1911
Publications disestablished in 1954
Mass media in Yangon